Brookfield Mines is a community in the Canadian province of Nova Scotia, in the Region of Queens Municipality .

References
Communities in Queens

Communities in the Region of Queens Municipality
General Service Areas in Nova Scotia